Mary Pierce and Larisa Neiland were the defending champions, but none competed this year. Neiland retired from professional tennis during this season.

Arantxa Sánchez Vicario and Anne-Gaëlle Sidot won the title by defeating Kim Clijsters and Laurence Courtois 6–7(6–8), 7–5, 6–3 in the final.

Seeds

Draw

Draw

References
 Official Results Archive (ITF)
 Official Results Archive (WTA)

Doubles
2000 WTA Tour